This article compares variety of different X window managers. For an introduction to the topic, see X Window System.

General information

Features

See also 

 Comparison of X Window System desktop environments
 Window manager
 List of Wayland compositors

References

External links 
 Comparison of extensible window managers compares window managers "extensible" by user scripts, like Sawfish, xmonad, etc.
 The Comprehensive List of Window Managers for Unix

Window managers
X window managers